Rakszawa  is a village in Łańcut County, Subcarpathian Voivodeship, in south-eastern Poland. It is the seat of the gmina (administrative district) called Gmina Rakszawa.

The village has a population of 6,100.

References

Rakszawa